Nataniel de Jesus Reis (born 25 March 1995), also known as Nataniel Reis, is an East Timorese football player who currently plays for Timor-Leste national football team.

International career
Reis made his senior international debut against Mongolia national football team in the second-leg 2018 FIFA World Cup qualification (AFC) on 17 March 2015.

International goals
Scores and results list East Timor's goal tally first.

References

External links
 

1995 births
Living people
East Timorese footballers
Timor-Leste international footballers
Association football midfielders
Footballers at the 2014 Asian Games
Footballers at the 2018 Asian Games
Competitors at the 2017 Southeast Asian Games
Asian Games competitors for East Timor
Southeast Asian Games competitors for East Timor